FC Union may refer to:

 1. FC Union Berlin, a German association football club
 1. FC Union Solingen, a German association football club
 FC Union Mühlhausen, a German football club
 FC Union Wels, a former Austrian association football club that merged to form FC Wels
 FC Union Cheb, the former name of FK Hvězda Cheb

See also 
 Racing FC Union Luxembourg, an association football club
 Union F.C., a Filipino football club based in Manila